Thomas or Tom Becker may refer to:

 Thomas Becker (bobsleigh) (born 1948), American Olympic bobsledder
 Thomas Becker (canoeist born 1967), German slalom canoeist competing in K-1
 Thomas Becker (canoeist born 1990), German slalom canoeist competing in C-2
 Thomas Albert Andrew Becker (1832–1899), American Catholic bishop
 Tom Becker (writer) (born 1981), British children's writer
 Tom Becker (baseball) (born 1975), Australian baseball pitcher
 Tom Becker (basketball) (1923–1991), American basketball player